Lynn Marie Latham is an American television writer, producer, and showrunner. Her initial foray into writing for television was as a story editor for the series Berrenger's in 1985. That same year, Latham became a writer for the nighttime serial Knots Landing.

Career
In 1991, she and husband Bernard Lechowick created the prime-time drama Homefront, based in the post-World War II era. Latham co-created the television dramas Wild Card, Hotel Malibu, and Second Chances. In addition to serving as Executive Producer on those series, Latham also executive-produced The District and That's Life. She was a creative consultant on both Savannah and Pacific Palisades, a writer and producer on Knots Landing, and head writer for the ABC Daytime soap opera Port Charles. Latham served as both Head Writer and Executive Producer of The Young and the Restless from 2006 to 2007. Her first episode as Y&R's head writer garnered 5,304,000 viewers while All My Children and Days of Our Lives received 3,235,000 and 3,972,000 viewers respectively.

Latham's father, John H. Latham, was a Western writer who published seven novels and over a thousand short stories. Her cousin, Aaron Latham, wrote the article that inspired the movie Urban Cowboy.

Positions held
Mama Malone
Writer: March 1984 - July 1984

Berrenger's
Story Editor: January 1985 - March 1985

Knots Landing (head writer from September 1986 - May 1991)
Producer: 1988 - 1991
Script Writer: 1985 - 1991
Executive Story Editor: 1985 - 1988HomefrontCreator
Writer: September 1991 - April 1993
Executive Producer: September 1991 - April 1993Hotel MalibuCreator
Writer: August 1994 - September 1994
Executive Producer: August 1994 - September 1994Live Through ThisExecutive Consultant: 2000Pacific PalisadesWriter: April 1997 - July 1997
Creative Consultant: April 1997 - July 1997Port CharlesHead Writer: 1997 - 1999SavannahWriter: 1996
Creative Consultant: 1996Second ChancesCreator
Writer: November 1993 - February 1994
Executive Producer: November 1993 - February 1994That's LifeWriter: 2001
Executive Producer: 2000 - 2001The DistrictWriter: 2000
Executive Producer: 2000Wild CardCreator
Writer: August 2003 - July 2005
Executive Producer: August 2003 - July 2005The Young and the RestlessExecutive Producer: September, 2006 - December 24, 2007
Head Writer: February 16, 2006 - December 24, 2007
Creative Consultant: November 14, 2005 - February 15, 2006

Knots Landing Credits
The following episodes were written by Latham

Lynn Marie Latham & Bernard Lechowick
124. A Man of Good Will

Lynn Marie Latham & Dianne Messina Stanley
269. Devil on My Shoulder
297. Upwardly Mobile

Lynn Marie Latham & James Stanley
240. Giganticus II: The Revenge
262. My First Born

Bernard Lechowick & Lynn Marie Latham
239. Birds Do It, Bees Do It

Lynn Marie Latham Solo Credits: 
 137. Awakenings
 141. To Sing His Praise
 149. A Key to a Woman's Heart
 155. The Legacy 163. Reunion
 170. Over the Edge
 178. My True Love
 184. Neighborly Conduct
 189. Do Not Fold, Spindle, or Mutilate
 191. Missing Persons
 195. There are Smiles
 201. Noises Everywhere (2)
 206. If Not Now, When?
 208. The Blushing Bride
 211. A Fair Race
 218. The Perfect Alibi
 221. Borderline
 223. The Pick-Up Game
 225. A Weekend Getaway
 229. Cabin Fever
 231. Mrs. Peacock in the Library with the Lead Pipe
 234. The Spin Doctor
 236. Double Jeopardy
 244. Straight Down the Line
 250. Prince Charming
 254. Mixed Messages
 257. Never Judge a Book By Its Cover
 266. The Grim Reaper
 275. The Fan Club
 278. Blind Side
 282. You Can Call Me Nick
 286. The Lady or the Tiger
 292. Always on Your Side
 294. Call Me Dimitri

Head Writing Tenure

Executive Producing Tenure

Awards
Writers Guild of America Award: Best Script of 1992 (Television Original Longform)
1992 & 1994 People's Choice Award
1993 Viewers For Quality Television Founder’s Award (Homefront)
Golden Globe Awards & Television Critics Association nominee for Best Drama: Homefront
Mosaic Award from the American Jewish Committee
Twice received Awards of Excellence in Programming from American Women in Radio and Television
Imagen Award from the National Conference of Christians and Jews for Second Chances for that series’ positive portrayal of Latinos
1999 Media Access Award for Port CharlesEaster Seals EDI Award (Equality Dignity Independence)
Soap Opera Digest Awards: Outstanding Prime Time Show from 1989-1992; Outstanding Storyline for 1990 and 1991.
Daytime Emmys: Outstanding Drama Series  2006-2007 for The Young and the Restless''

References

External links
CBS Daytime: Y&R
ArthurSwift
EpilepsyFoundation
SPT: Y&R

Producers Guild of America

American soap opera writers
American screenwriters
Daytime Emmy Award winners
Writers Guild of America Award winners
American women television writers
Place of birth missing (living people)
Year of birth missing (living people)
Living people
Soap opera producers
American television producers
American women television producers
American women screenwriters
Women soap opera writers
21st-century American women